Clone High (occasionally referred to in the United States as Clone High USA) is an adult animated science fiction sitcom created by Phil Lord, Christopher Miller and Bill Lawrence. The series centers on a high school populated by the clones of well-known historical figures. The central cast includes adolescent depictions of Abe Lincoln, Joan of Arc, Gandhi, Cleopatra, and JFK. The series also serves as a parody of teen dramas such as Dawson's Creek and Beverly Hills, 90210; every episode is introduced as a "very special episode".

Lord and Miller first developed the series' concept, originally named "Clone High School, USA!" while at Dartmouth College in the 1990s, later pitching it to executives at US network Fox Broadcasting Company, who ultimately decided to pass on the program. It was later purchased by cable channel MTV, and was produced between 2002 and 2003. The show's design is heavily stylized and its animation style limited, emphasizing humor and story over visuals. The Clone High theme song was written by Tommy Walter and performed by his alternative rock band Abandoned Pools, who also provided much of the series' background music.

It was first aired in its entirety on Canadian cable network Teletoon between 2002 and 2003, later premiering on MTV. It became embroiled in a controversy regarding its depiction of Gandhi soon afterward, which prompted over one hundred people in India to mount a hunger strike in response. Shortly after, MTV pulled the series, which had been receiving low ratings. Clone High attracted mixed reviews from television critics upon its premiere, but it has since received critical acclaim and a cult following. On July 2, 2020, it was announced that a revival of the series is in the works at MTV Entertainment Studios with the original creators Lord, Miller, and Lawrence returning. On February 10, 2021, it was announced that HBO Max had ordered two seasons of the revival and it is set to premiere in 2023.

Premise
Clone High is set in a high school in the fictional town of Exclamation, USA, that is secretly being run as an elaborate military experiment orchestrated by a government office called the Secret Board of Shadowy Figures. The school is entirely populated by the clones of famous historical figures that were created in the 1980s and raised with the intent of having their various strengths and abilities harnessed by the United States military. The principal of the high school, Cinnamon J. Scudworth, has his own plans for the clones, and secretly tries to undermine the wishes of the Board (Scudworth wants to use the clones to create a clone-themed amusement park, dubbed "Cloney Island", a decidedly less evil intention than that of the Board). He is assisted by his robot butler/vice principal/dehumidifier, Mr. Butlertron (a parody of Mr. Belvedere), who is programmed to call everyone "Wesley" and speak in three distinct intonations.

The main protagonists of Clone High are the clones of Abe Lincoln, Joan of Arc, and Gandhi. Much of the plot of the show revolves around the attempts of Abe to woo the vain and promiscuous clone of Cleopatra, while being oblivious to the fact that his friend Joan of Arc is attracted to him. Meanwhile, JFK's clone, a macho, narcissistic womanizer, is also attempting to win over Cleopatra and has a long-standing rivalry with Abe. Gandhi acts in many of the episodes as the comic relief. Also on a few occasions, the characters that we see learn most of "Life's Lessons" the hard way.

Characters

Main

 Abe Lincoln (voiced by Will Forte) is a clone of Abraham Lincoln and the main protagonist. He admires his clonefather Abraham Lincoln and feels that he is struggling to live up to him. He is in love with Cleopatra and has a very naïve and awkward personality. Abe doesn't notice that Joan has feelings for him and unintentionally mistreats her by reinterpreting it as a sign of friendship.
 Joan of Arc (voiced by Nicole Sullivan) is a clone of Joan of Arc and Abe's closest friend and confidante. She is an intelligent, cynical and angsty goth. She loves Abe and hates how he ignores her in order to hook up with Cleopatra. She holds progressive political views, and "somewhat naively support[s] every special-interest cause." 
 Gandhi (voiced by Michael McDonald) is a clone of Mahatma Gandhi and Abe's other best friend. He, like Abe, is struggling to live up to his clonefather Mahatma Gandhi. As a result, he reinvents himself as a wild party animal, and serves as the show's comic relief.
 Cleopatra "Cleo" Smith (voiced by Christa Miller) is a clone of Cleopatra VII and a self-absorbed, vain, and often mean-spirited popular cheerleader. She has relationships with both JFK and Abe. She becomes Joan of Arc's foster sister when Cleopatra's foster mother begins dating Joan's foster grandfather.
 JFK (voiced by Chris Miller) is a clone of John F. Kennedy and a handsome, popular, arrogant, and horny jock as well as Abe's on-and-off rival for Cleo's affections.
 Principal Scudworth (Dr. Cinnamon J. Scudworth) (voiced by Phil Lord) is a literal mad scientist and the principal of Clone High, who secretly plans to use the clones as attractions for his hypothetical amusement park, dubbed "Cloney Island," and many of the series' subplots surround him trying to find ways to accelerate his plans.
 Mr. Lynn Butlertron (voiced by Chris Miller) is Scudworth's Mr. Belvedere-esque sane robotic butler and reluctant sidekick in his schemes. He refers to everyone as "Wesley".

Supporting
 Phil Lord as Genghis Khan
 Nicole Sullivan as Marie Curie
 Donald Faison as Toots, Wally, X-Stream Bob, Martin Luther King Jr. and George Washington Carver
 Neil Flynn as Julius Caesar, Buddy Holly, Carl, Moses, Krabby Kakes, and Glenn The Janitor
 Andy Dick as Mr. Sheepman, Police Officer and Vincent van Gogh
 Murray Miller as Catherine the Great
 Judah Miller as Scangrade
 Debra Wilson as Harriet Tubman, Eva Perón, Skunky-Poo, Reporter
 Sarah Chalke as X-Stream Erin, Marie Antoinette
 Zach Braff as X-Stream Mike, Paul Revere
 Joe Flaherty as Abe's Foster Dad
 Mandy Moore as herself

 Jack Black as Larry Hardcore/the Pusher

Production

Miller initially developed the show's premise while in college, initially imagining the clones would be at a university rather than high school. The series was originally developed in 2000 under the title Clone High School, USA!. The production was overseen by Touchstone Television. It was originally pitched to the Fox Broadcasting Company, who purchased the show immediately but ultimately decided not to order it to series. Miller deemed it the "easiest pitch ever," considering the show's use of famous figures. Following Fox's rejection, MTV purchased the program in May 2001. All the original character designs were much different from what they would become even though the characters kept the same physical attributes and appearance. Each episode was budgeted at approximately $750,000.

Despite being an US/Canadian co-production, the show was co-produced with Touchstone Television, marking as Disney's third adult animated series after The PJs and Clerks: The Animated Series.

In forming the series' central cast, they found themselves limited in the number of historical figures they could depict, in consideration with avoiding "litigious estates" (such as the families of Albert Einstein or Marilyn Monroe) and keeping in mind the viewership of MTV. The show also parodies teen dramas, such as Dawson's Creek, which Lord and Miller watched in preparation to create the series. The show's art design has been described as angular and "evocative of UPA at its best." It is characterized by a flat and very stylized appearance resembling the animation used in Cartoon Network's animated series from the 1990s and early 2000s, such as Dexter's Laboratory, The Powerpuff Girls and Time Squad. Lord and Miller specifically cited Samurai Jack as an influence. The character designs were all done by Carey Yost, known for his work on Dexter's Laboratory, Samurai Jack, The Powerpuff Girls, The Ren & Stimpy Show, and Timon & Pumbaa. The characters and backgrounds were traditionally drawn, and frames and cels were frequently recycled. Co-creator Chris Miller explained, "We like the snappy pose-to-pose animation, more for reasons of comic timing than anything else. Things that aren't expected are funnier: If an anvil's going to fall on your head, it had better not take more than three seconds. That's why we like the quick pose-to-pose stuff. For scenes with more emotional content, the characters move a little slower and more fluidly". Phil Lord added, "But we never want the viewer to be paying attention to the animation, because it's there to serve the jokes and the story. We strip out extraneous movements, because we don't want to draw your eye to anything that's not part of a joke." Gandhi is the most animated character on the show; he requires twice as many story-board poses as any other character. Total Drama character designer Todd Kauffman did designs for the show's intro. Kauffman later used Clone High as an influence to design the Total Drama characters as requested by the producers.

The series was produced by Bill Lawrence, who also produced Scrubs, Spin City and Cougar Town. Many Scrubs alumni, such as Zach Braff, Donald Faison, Sarah Chalke, John C. McGinley, Neil Flynn, and Christa Miller, provided the voices of characters in Clone High for free. Writing and voice work were done at North Hollywood Medical Center, where Scrubs was filmed.

Clone High was notable for subtle jokes hidden in the animation. There is an image of a dolphin hidden in almost every episode. The use of dolphins (sounds or images) would be later featured in Lord and Miller's later work. In the episode "Raisin the Stakes", there were numerous hidden messages, which appeared to be a parody of subliminal messaging.

Themes and style
While the clones derive many character qualities from their ancestors, much of the humor in the show comes from the large contrast between the personality of the clones and the actual values and legacy of the historical figures they are descended from. For instance, Gandhi is portrayed as a hyperactive jerk-with-a-heart-of-gold whose biggest dream is to be accepted by those around him, in contrast to his historical legacy of calm nonviolence. Abe Lincoln is similarly portrayed as weak and indecisive, completely lacking the resolve of the President whose DNA he shares. All of the clones are also given mis-matched foster parents who have little in common with them. Gandhi's parents are a stereotypical Jewish-American couple, while JFK is raised by a homosexual, interracial couple; Joan's "foster grandpa" is an elderly blind musician similar to Ray Charles named Toots.

The series also includes humor based on the historical figures themselves. For example, the diner the clones frequent is called The Grassy Knoll, a reference to the JFK assassination conspiracy theory about a second shooter, dubbed "The Man on the Grassy Knoll". Other references seen are the flag at The Grassy Knoll being permanently at half mast and the car on the roof of the diner containing the original JFK's body leaning over the edge. There are pictures of assassinations hanging on the walls of the restaurant, such as the famous Currier and Ives print of the Lincoln assassination (though this version is in color and considerably more graphic than the original print). The genetic ancestors of all of the five main clones died of similarly irregular causes: three assassinations, one execution and one suicide. Other historical figure-based humor includes offhand coincidental remarks to other students, such as Abe mentioning that the clone of Napoleon is so annoying because of "some kind of complex", or Gandhi telling Catherine the Great to "get off her high horse".

The series is also a parody of "issue" episodes of high-school themed comedies. Each episode is introduced as a "very special episode." Episodes center on various social issues, including Gandhi being shunned by his school for having ADD (because of misinformation about the disorder), parodying shows which tackle AIDS awareness (it even included a special guest celebrity who tries to educate the students). Other episodes tackle drugs (smoking raisins), the environment, and underage drinking in a similarly ridiculous manner. In a clear sign that it is parodying the high school genre, it even ends at prom: a stereotypical "high school show" ending. Even the prom is a joke, however, because it ends up only being the Winter Prom.

There was a running gag that creators Phil Lord and Christopher Miller wanted to include in the show "where Clone High – being an exaggeration of typical high schools in teen dramas – would have many proms throughout the year". Planned proms included "an Early Winter Prom, a Late Winter/Early Spring Prom, a Mid-Semester Prom, a Post-Prom Clean Up Prom, etc". The only surviving references to this joke are the Homecoming Prom in episode 6, "Homecoming: A Shot in D'Arc", and the winter prom in episode 13, "Changes: The Big Prom: The Sex Romp: The Season Finale". Another reference to the gag was deleted from episode 8, "A Room of One's Clone: Pie of the Storm".

Episodes

Soundtrack
The previous animated MTV series Daria and Beavis and Butt-Head had used then-current popular music as a soundtrack, but, in contrast, Clone High featured a wide variety of music, usually exclusive to alternative rock, indie rock, midwest emo, hardcore punk, pop rock, metalcore, from mostly unknown and underground bands and musicians; a previous MTV animated series, Undergrads, had also done this. Of these include Alkaline Trio, American Football, Ritalin, Catch 22, Ilya, The Gentleman, Drex, Taking Back Sunday, The Gloria Record, The Stereo, Jo Davidson, Saves the Day, Hot Rod Circuit, Thursday, Helicopter Helicopter, Owen, Dashboard Confessional, Elf Power, Abandoned Pools, The Get Up Kids, Mink Lungs, Mates of State, Snapcase, The Mooney Suzuki, Jon DeRosa, Ephemera, Jinnrall, Avoid One Thing, DJ Cellulitis, DJ Piccolo, Whippersnapper, Matt Pond PA, Mad City and Bumblefoot. The series' other background music and original score was written and produced by Scott Nickoley and Jamie Dunlap of Mad City Productions. Nickoley and Dunlap went on to score other shows such as South Park, The Osbournes and Newlyweds.

Broadcast and home media
Clone High was first aired in its entirety on the Canadian cable network Teletoon between 2002 and 2003, later premiering on MTV. Reruns of the series were formerly aired on Teletoon's now-defunct Teletoon at Night (formerly known as "Teletoon Detour") block. Also, it briefly aired on MTV, Razer (now MTV2), and Much and currently airs on Adult Swim in Canada. The series aired on MTV Classic in 2016 for a short time.

DVD and streaming
The series was released as "The Complete First Season" in Canada by Kaboom! Entertainment and Nelvana. The DVD contains the complete original series, including the five episodes which did not originally air in the U.S.

As of 2023, the series is available to be streamed on Paramount+ in the United States.

Reception

Initial reviews
Television critics gave Clone High mixed reviews upon its 2002 premiere. On Metacritic, which assigns a normalized rating out of 100 based on reviews from critics, the show has a score of 60, based on seven reviews, indicating "mixed or average reviews". David Bianculli of the New York Daily News praised the series, commenting, "In a year of variations and ripoffs of established themes and genres, it's a true original. It's also a cartoon, and is truly, outrageously bizarre." The Pittsburgh Post-Gazette Rob Owen complimented the show: "Yes, Clone High has the MTV-requisite sexual innuendo, but it's more clever than much of what passes for humor in prime time today. And like Scrubs, it has heart, particularly when it comes to Abe and Joan." Anita Gates of The New York Times opined that "the dialogue isn't always exactly funny, but it's smile worthy," observing, "the characters are intriguing in a lightweight way but could lose their appeal fast." Scott Sandell of the Los Angeles Times felt the show's debut episode lacking: "The problem is that the first episode, which focuses on crushes and beer, doesn't quite live up to the obvious comedic potential behind the killer premise." The Hollywood Reporter Michael Farkash felt similarly, writing, "The premise sounds intriguing, but what hatches in the first episode is a disappointing, weak strain of comic material, lacking the cunning, subversive quality of, say, South Park."

Gandhi controversy
In early 2003, an article in Maxim magazine depicting Mahatma Gandhi being beaten up by a muscular man sparked outrage in India. Clone High was caught in a crossfire when citizens in the country conducted internet searches on the Maxim article but also found out about the show's Gandhi character on MTV's website. This sparked an outrage in India over the show's depiction of Gandhi. On January 30, 2003, the 55th anniversary of Mahatma Gandhi's assassination, approximately 150 protesters (including members of parliament) gathered in New Delhi and vowed to fast in response to Clone High, including Gandhi's great-grandson Tushar Gandhi. Tom Freston, the head of Viacom (owner of MTV), was visiting the network's India branch and was "trapped in the building", according to Miller. In 2014, he recalled that protestors "basically threatened that they'd revoke MTV's broadcasting license in India if they didn't take the show off the air".

MTV offered a quick apology, stating that "Clone High was created and intended for an American audience", and "we recognize and respect that various cultures may view this programming differently, and we regret any offense taken by the content in the show". Miller would later recall that executives at MTV enjoyed the show, and asked for the duo to pitch a second season without Gandhi. Lord and Miller's two potential versions of a second season included one that made no mention of Gandhi's absence, and another that revealed that the character was, in fact, a clone of actor Gary Coleman all along, and the show continued as normal. "We pitched that, and it went up to the top at Viacom again and it got a big no," he remembered.

Retrospective reviews
Due to the series' early cancellation in 2003, it quickly fell into obscurity, especially in the U.S. However, it has garnered a large fanbase and cult-following throughout the Internet.
Heather Marulli, of the website Television Without Pity, called the series "a mini-masterpiece of the animated genre; an opus to the primetime cartoon".

David Broermann, from the website Freakin' Awesome Network, gave the series an "A+", saying it has "some really really good character development and depth" and an "amazing soundtrack" He notes the fantastic use of multiple running gags keeping viewers on their toes.

It is listed as #5 on IGN's "Reader Choice: Top Animated Series".

Jesse David Fox of Vulture, in a retrospective piece on the series, wrote that "Clone High still holds up more than a decade later as a brilliantly funny, completely nuts, surprisingly heartfelt, tonally inventive masterpiece."

Revival
Lord and Miller have stated that they have "considered" a film adaptation of the series. In 2014, they explained that as they at that time were under contract with Fox, Lawrence had a television deal at Warner Bros. Television and the rights to Clone High were owned by MTV/Viacom, it would be difficult to resurrect the show. References to Clone High are present in their later productions: the duo admitted many jokes in 22 Jump Street were "ripped off straight from Clone High", while Forte also voices a Lego version of Lincoln in The Lego Movie. In a 2014 Grantland article, the two joked that "our entire career has just been about getting Clone High back on the air". In the 2018 film Spider-Man: Into the Spider-Verse, produced by Lord and Miller, a billboard appears promoting a movie titled "Clone College", starring Abe and JFK.

On July 2, 2020, it was announced that a revival of the series was in the works at MTV Entertainment Studios, with creators Phil Lord, Christopher Miller and Bill Lawrence returning; it was also revealed that original series writer Erica Rivinoja would serve as showrunner of the series, while also co-writing the pilot with Lord and Miller. On February 10, 2021, the series was ordered for two seasons by HBO Max. On June 23, 2021, Christopher Miller revealed the title of the revival's first episode as "Let's Try This Again". On September 16, 2021, Tara Billinger, who is known for Mickey Mouse's Paul Rudish reboot era and Long Gone Gulch, announced that she would be serving as art director. On October 29, 2022, Miller announced via Twitter, that the revival would premiere in the first half of 2023. On November 2, 2022, Lord, Miller and Billinger posted teasers of the show on their Twitter pages.

On January 28, 2023, the unfinished first episode of the revival was leaked.

See also
 Afterschool Charisma
 Cultural depictions of John F. Kennedy
 Dolly the sheep

References

External links

 
 Official behind the scenes website
 
 
 UWO Gazette article about Clone High
 Flak magazine: Clone High 

2000s American adult animated television series
2000s American comedy-drama television series
2000s American comic science fiction television series
2000s American high school television series
2000s American satirical television series
2000s American teen sitcoms
2002 American television series debuts
2003 American television series endings
2000s Canadian adult animated television series
2000s Canadian comedy-drama television series
2000s Canadian comic science fiction television series
2000s Canadian high school television series
2000s Canadian satirical television series
2000s Canadian teen sitcoms
2002 Canadian television series debuts
2003 Canadian television series endings
American adult animated comedy television series
American adult animated drama television series
American adult animated science fiction television series
American animated sitcoms
Animation based on real people
Animation controversies in television
Canadian adult animated comedy television series
Canadian adult animated drama television series
Canadian adult animated science fiction television series
Canadian animated sitcoms
English-language television shows
HBO Max original programming
MTV cartoons
Teletoon original programming
Television controversies in the United States
Television controversies in Canada
Television series about cloning
Television series by Paramount Television
Television series by ABC Studios
Television series by Nelvana
Television series by Rough Draft Studios
Teen animated television series
Television series created by Bill Lawrence (TV producer)
Television series created by Christopher Miller (filmmaker)
Cultural depictions of Abraham Lincoln
Cultural depictions of Joan of Arc
Cultural depictions of Mahatma Gandhi
Cultural depictions of John F. Kennedy
Cultural depictions of Cleopatra